Made in Chelsea: LA, a spin-off series of Made in Chelsea, a British structured-reality television programme, was confirmed on 14 May 2015. It was announced that the cast of Made in Chelsea would be travelling to Los Angeles to film a special series of the show. It was revealed that this would be a stand-alone series which would not be promoted as the tenth series. The tenth series followed in October 2015. Filming for the spin-off began in late May 2015 and concluded in late-July. This is the second spin-off show filmed in America following the NYC special the previous year. The third episode of this series was filmed in Las Vegas. The six-episode series began on 10 August 2015 on E4. It also featured the brief return of former cast member Gabriella Ellis, as well as the permanent return of Ollie Locke. It was the only series to include American cast members Olivia Fox and Naz Gharai, and the last to include Josh Shepherd. Whilst most of the Chelsea cast featured in this spin-off, there was notable absences from Elliot Cross, Oliver Proudlock, Millie Wilkinson, Nicola Hughes, Rosie Fortescue, Sam Thompson, Spencer Matthews, Tiff Watson, and Victoria Baker-Harber. The series included the end of the relationship between Josh and Stephanie, Jamie starting a holiday romance with Naz before eventually realising he actually has feelings for Jess, and Binky opening up to JP about her growing love for him only for him to break things off completely.

Cast

Episodes

{| class="wikitable plainrowheaders" style="width:100%; background:#fff;"
|- style="color:black"
! style="background: #E3CEF6;"| SeriesNo.
! style="background: #E3CEF6;"| EpisodeNo.
! style="background: #E3CEF6;"| Title
! style="background: #E3CEF6;"| Original airdate
! style="background: #E3CEF6;"| Duration
! style="background: #E3CEF6;"| UK viewers

|}

Broadcast
Internationally, the series premiered in Australia on 8 November 2015 on LifeStyle You.

Ratings

External links

References

2015 British television seasons
British television spin-offs
LA 
Television shows set in Los Angeles